Brázdim (until 1949 Veliký Brázdim) is a municipality in Prague-East District in the Central Bohemian Region of the Czech Republic. It has about 700 inhabitants.

Administrative parts
The municipality is made up of villages of Nový Brázdim, Starý Brázdim and Veliký Brázdim.

History
The first written mention of Brázdim is from 1052. At that time, it was formed by several cottages and two fortresses called Velký Brázdim and Malý Brázdim. In 1777, the village of Nový Brázdim was founded and Malý Brázdim was renamed Starý Brázdim.

References

External links

 

Villages in Prague-East District